Brunkollen is a mountain on the border of Dovre Municipality in Innlandet county and Oppdal Municipality in Trøndelag county in Norway. The mountain is surrounded by several other notable mountains including Tverrfjellet to the southeast, Einøvlingseggen and Skredahøin to the southwest, Snøhetta and Storstyggesvånåtinden to the west.

See also
List of mountains of Norway

References

Dovre
Oppdal
Mountains of Innlandet
Mountains of Trøndelag